The men's Greco-Roman lightweight was a Greco-Roman wrestling event held as part of the Wrestling at the 1924 Summer Olympics programme. It was the fourth appearance of the event. Lightweight was the third-lightest category, including wrestlers weighing 62 to 67 kilograms.

Results
Source: Official results; Wudarski

The tournament was double-elimination.

First round

Second round

Third round

Fourth round

Fifth round

Sixth round

This was the final round.  Friman won gold, undefeated.  Keresztes took silver and Westerlund bronze, as Kusnets finished fourth.

References

Wrestling at the 1924 Summer Olympics
Greco-Roman wrestling